Yongkang is a railway station of the Taiwan Railways Administration West Coast line located in Yongkang District, Tainan City, Taiwan.

Around the station
 Freeway 1
 Yongkang District Administration Center
 Tainan Municipal Yongkang Junior High School
 The Affiliated Senior High School of National University of Tainan
 Tainan University of Technology

See also
 List of railway stations in Taiwan

References 

Railway stations served by Taiwan Railways Administration
Railway stations in Tainan
Railway stations opened in 1903
1903 establishments in Taiwan
Yongkang District